NS27, NS 27, NS-27, NS.27, or variation, may refer to:

Places
 Marina Bay MRT station (station code: NS27), Downtown Core, Singapore; a mass transit station
 Halifax Citadel-Sable Island (constituency N.S. 27), Nova Scotia, Canada; a provincial electoral district

Other uses
 North Shore Rail Road NS #27, a Pullman passenger car s/n 254, preserved and operated on the White Pass; see List of White Pass and Yukon Route locomotives and cars
 New Penguin Shakespeare volume 27

See also

 NS (disambiguation)
 27 (disambiguation)

Disambiguation pages